This is a list of diplomatic missions of East Timor. As the poorest country in Asia with a limited number of trained personnel, East Timor is only slowly beginning to develop its network of embassies abroad. Most of its missions are located in countries which composed the Portuguese colonial empire, as well as in all member-states of the Association of Southeast Asian Nations (ASEAN), to which it seeks full membership.

Honorary consulates are not included in this listing.

Africa

Americas

Asia

Europe

Oceania

Multilateral organisations

Gallery

See also
 Foreign relations of East Timor
 List of diplomatic missions in East Timor
 Visa policy of East Timor

Notes

References

External links
 Embassies, Missions and Consulates of the Democratic Republic of Timor Leste Abroad

East Timor
Diplomatic missions